Mount Sinai Medical Center is a hospital located at 4300 Alton Road in Miami Beach, Florida, and is the largest independent non-profit hospital in South Florida. The institution was incorporated on March 11, 1946, and opened on its current location on December 4, 1949.

Locations and affiliations
Mount Sinai Medical Center includes six locations throughout Miami-Dade County. In 2009, Mount Sinai Medical Center began an affiliation with Columbia University, allowing for students and patients to treat, research, and study between Miami and New York City. As part of the affiliation, the Mount Sinai Heart Institute and the Columbia University Divisions of Cardiology and Urology at Mount Sinai were created. This institution is not affiliated with the Mount Sinai School of Medicine or Mount Sinai Hospital, established in 1852 in New York.

The center's five satellite locations include a freestanding emergency department, physician offices, diagnostic center and cancer center in Aventura, physician offices in Coral Gables, Hialeah and Key Biscayne and a diagnostic catheterization and sleep lab in Coral Gables. Mount Sinai includes more than 700 physicians, 3,500 employees and 500 volunteers.

Facilities

, the medical center has 589 staffed beds.

Miami Heart Institute 
Mount Sinai purchased Miami Heart Institute in 2000 for $75 million on the theory that consolidating the two hospitals would slowly ease the competition of the two nearby facilities and improve their image. Many of Miami Heart Institute's Doctors, nurses and skilled technical staff were transferred over to Mount Sinai as part of the acquisition. In February 2012, Mount Sinai Medical Center sold the Miami Heart Institute building, which was redeveloped into a luxury condo under the Ritz-Carlton brand. , Mount Sinai Medical Center is the only hospital and largest employer on Miami Beach.

Mount Sinai Medical Center

Mount Sinai Medical Center provides following clinical services:

Mount Sinai currently has 15 different buildings/pavilions and they are as follows:
 Ascher Building
 Blum Pavilion
 Comprehensive Cancer Center
 De Hirsch Meyer Tower (Main Building)
 Energy Building
 Golden Medical Office Building
 Greene Pavilion
 Greenspan Pavilion
 Gumenick Ambulatory Surgical Center
 Knight MRI Center
 Lowenstein Building
 Simon Medical Office Building
 Orovitz Emergency Building
 Pearlman Research Facility
 Warner Pavilion

Notable births
 Laila Ali a former professional boxer, and daughter of world famous boxer Muhammad Ali, was born in Miami Heart Institute on December 30, 1977.

Notable deaths
 Margaret Hayes a film, stage, and television actress from Baltimore died in the hospital.
 Maurice Gibb a musician, singer and songwriter from Douglas, Isle of Man who was a member of the popular music group The Bee Gees, died at the hospital.
 Michael Glyn Brown, a former hand surgeon from Houston involved in legal disputes, died at the hospital.
 Vic Damone, a singer and actor, from New York City died at the hospital.
 Zaha Hadid, an architect from Iraq, died at the hospital.
 Nelson Eddy, an actor and baritone singer, died at the hospital in the early morning hours of March 6, 1967 after being stricken on stage with a cerebral hemorrhage while performing at the Sans Souci Hotel.

References

 Miami Heart Institute site is slated to become Ritz-Carlton Residences Miami Beach. Martha Brannigan, Miami Herald on 17 October 2013. Retrieved on 28 October 2013.

External links
 Website of the Mount Sinai Medical Center

Hospital buildings completed in 1949
Hospitals in Florida
Buildings and structures in Miami Beach, Florida
Heart disease organizations
1946 establishments in Florida
Hospitals established in 1946
Jewish medical organizations
Jews and Judaism in Miami Beach, Florida